The Coat of arms of Kurdistan Region is a Republican Eagle holding a sun on his wings and used by Kurdistan Region.

See also

Eagle of Saladin

References

External links
Print versions
Vector version of KRG Emblem (PDF, CMYK, 285 KB) 
Vector version of KRG Emblem (PDF, RGB, 298 KB) 

Kurdistan
Kurdish culture
Kurdistan
Kurdistan
Kurdish nationalist symbols